Austropyrgus niger is a species of minute freshwater snail with an operculum, an aquatic gastropod mollusc or micromollusc in the family Hydrobiidae. This species is endemic to southeastern Tasmania, Australia. It is found in small coastal streams along the D'Entrecasteaux Channel.

See also 
 List of non-marine molluscs of Australia

References

Further reading

External links
 
 

Hydrobiidae
Austropyrgus
Gastropods of Australia
Endemic fauna of Australia
Gastropods described in 1834